Yıldız İbrahimova (born 1952 in Silistra) is a Bulgarian singer of Turkish ancestry. Besides jazz, she has also recorded Bulgarian, Turkish, Gypsy and Russian folk songs. She married Ali Dinçer, a Turkish politician, also born in Bulgaria and former mayor of Ankara, in 1993. Since then she has lived in Turkey. Her husband died in 2007.

Yildiz Ibrahimova has participated in tours in over 40 countries in Europe, North America, Asia, Australia and Africa.

Albums
Her records include the following albums:

 (1979) Turkish Folk Songs, LP, Balkanton, Sofia-Bulgaria
 (1981) Naissus Jazz-81-LP, Discos, Nish-Serbia
 (1987) Jazz and Something More, LP, Balkanton
 (1987  The Girl with Lovely Eyes, LP, Balkanton
 (1990) Illusory Eternity, LP, Balkanton
 (1991) Paris -Zagreb, with Antoine Herve quintet, CD-DEUX Z, Paris, France
 (1992) Illusory Eternıty, CD, Balkanton
 (1992) Hard way to Freedom -with Anatoly Vapirov - AVA Records, Sofia, Bulgaria
 (1995) Ișığın Sesi (Voice of Rainbow)- Raks Music, Istanbul, Turkey
 (1997) Balkanatolia feat. Ivo Papasov, Raks Music, Istanbul
 (1999) Marcanja e Romeskere Gilya (Songs of the Gypsy), Universal Music Turkey
 (2000) Marcanja-Songs of the Gypsy, Virginia Records-Universal Music Bulgaria
 (2003) Çocukça Șarkılar-Children Songs, Boyut, Istanbul, Turkey
 (2003) Pesni za Malki i Golemi-Children Songs, Virginia Records-Universal Bulgaria
 (2005) 30 Years on Stage, Virginia Records
 (2009) Back to my Love, Virginia Records-Bulgaria
 (2011) Balkanatolia 2 - Annemden Rumeli Türküleri-Kalan-Turkey

References

External links
Rateyourmusic.com — Yıldız İbrahimova
Agency for Bulgarian Artists — photo and biography highlights in Bulgarian
International Famagusta Festival - Yıldız İbrahimova

1952 births
Living people
20th-century Bulgarian women singers
21st-century Bulgarian women singers
20th-century Turkish women singers
21st-century Turkish women singers
Bulgarian Turks in Turkey
Bulgarian jazz singers
Turkish jazz singers
People from Silistra